A tantō is a type of knife in Japanese martial arts.

Tantou may also refer to:

Towns in China 
Tantou, Longhui (滩头镇), in Longhui County
Tantou, Zhejiang (坦头镇), in Tiantai County

Chinese towns written as 潭头镇 
Tantou, Changle, Fujian
Tantou, Fu'an, Fujian
Tantou, Guangdong, in Gaozhou
Tantou, Henan, in Luanchuan County

Townships in China 
Tantou Township, Guangxi (潭头乡), in Rong'an County
Tantou Township, Jiangxi (潭头乡), in Yongfeng County
Tantou Township, Yunnan (滩头乡), in Yanjin County